The 48th New York State Legislature, consisting of the New York State Senate and the New York State Assembly, met from January 4 to April 21, 1825, during the first year of DeWitt Clinton's second tenure as Governor of New York, in Albany.

Background
Under the provisions of the New York Constitution of 1821, 32 Senators were elected on general tickets in eight senatorial districts for four-year terms. They were divided into four classes, and every year eight Senate seats came up for election. Assemblymen were elected countywide on general tickets to a one-year term, the whole Assembly being renewed annually.

The previous session had been dominated by the controversy about the presidential succession, and the question how to choose presidential electors. Party lines broke down when Martin Van Buren tried to have the "Bucktails" faction of the Democratic-Republican Party support William H. Crawford for U.S. president. A large part of the Bucktails favored John Quincy Adams, Henry Clay, Andrew Jackson and John C. Calhoun as possible presidential candidates, and proposed to have the presidential electors elected by the people in districts, similar to the congressional elections. The Anti-Crawford factions became known as the "People's Party", and they joined forces with the "Clintonians" (supporters of DeWitt Clinton, opposed to the Bucktails). The rump Bucktail faction (which followed Van Buren) was called the "Regency Party" by their opponents, a reference to the Albany Regency.

On April 3, a caucus of Bucktail legislators, consisting of the Regency men and a minority of People's men, nominated Canal Commissioner Samuel Young for Governor; and Lt. Gov. Erastus Root for re-election.

On September 22, a State convention "in favor of a new electoral law", consisting of about 30 People's men and about 90 Clintonians, nominated Ex-Gov. DeWitt Clinton for Governor, and Assemblyman James Tallmadge, Jr. (PP) for Lieutenant Governor.

Elections
The State election was held from November 1 to 3, 1824. DeWitt Clinton and James Tallmadge Jr. were elected in a landslide.

Cadwallader D. Colden (1st D.), Wells Lake (2nd D.), Richard McMichael (3rd D.), George Brayton (5th D.), Stukely Ellsworth (6th D.), John C. Spencer (7th D.); and Assemblymen John Crary (4th D.) and Samuel Wilkeson (8th D.) were elected to the Senate. Lake and Ellsworth were Bucktails, the other six were Clintonians.

Sessions
The Legislature met for the regular session at the Old State Capitol in Albany on January 4, 1825, and adjourned on April 21.

Clarkson Crolius (PP) was elected Speaker with 109 votes out of 122.

In his message to the Legislature, Gov. Clinton recommended to enact that presidential electors be chosen by the people, by general ticket and a plurality of votes.

On February 1, the Legislature failed to elect a successor to U.S. Senator Rufus King, and the seat became vacant on March 4, 1825.

On February 16, the Legislature elected Gamaliel H. Barstow (Clint.) to succeed Abraham Keyser, Jr. (Buckt.) as New York State Treasurer.

State Senate

Districts
The First District (4 seats) consisted of Kings, New York, Queens, Richmond and Suffolk counties.
The Second District (4 seats) consisted of Dutchess, Orange, Putnam, Rockland, Sullivan, Ulster and Westchester counties.
The Third District (4 seats) consisted of Albany, Columbia, Greene, Rensselaer, Schenectady and Schoharie counties.
The Fourth District (4 seats) consisted of Clinton, Essex, Franklin, Hamilton, Montgomery, St. Lawrence, Saratoga, Warren and Washington counties.
The Fifth District (4 seats) consisted of Herkimer, Jefferson, Lewis, Madison, Oneida and Oswego counties.
The Sixth District (4 seats) consisted of Broome, Chenango, Cortland, Delaware, Otsego, Tioga and Tompkins counties.
The Seventh District (4 seats) consisted of Cayuga, Onondaga, Ontario, Seneca, Wayne and Yates counties.
The Eighth District (4 seats) consisted of Allegany, Cattaraugus, Chautauqua, Erie, Genesee, Livingston, Monroe, Niagara and Steuben counties.

Note: There are now 62 counties in the State of New York. The counties which are not mentioned in this list had not yet been established, or sufficiently organized, the area being included in one or more of the abovementioned counties.

Members
The asterisk (*) denotes members of the previous Legislature who continued in office as members of this Legislature. John Crary and Samuel Wilkeson changed from the Assembly to the Senate.

The party affiliations follow the vote for a U.S. senator on February 1 which showed that there was no majority; and that Clintonians and People's men, although having combined for the election against the Bucktails, were opposed to each other.

Employees
Clerk: John F. Bacon

State Assembly

Districts

Albany County (3 seats)
Allegany County (1 seat)
Broome County (1 seat)
Cattaraugus County (1 seat)
Cayuga County (4 seats)
Chautauqua County (1 seat)
Chenango County (3 seats)
Clinton County (1 seat)
Columbia County (3 seats)
Cortland County (2 seats)
Delaware County (2 seats)
Dutchess County (4 seats)
Erie County (1 seat)
Essex County (1 seat)
Franklin County (1 seat)
Genesee County (4 seats)
Greene County (2 seats)
Hamilton and Montgomery counties (4 seats)
Herkimer County (3 seats)
Jefferson County (3 seats)
Kings County (1 seat)
Lewis County (1 seat)
Livingston County (2 seats)
Madison County (3 seats)
Monroe County (3 seats)
The City and County of New York (10 seats)
Niagara County (1 seat)
Oneida County (5 seats)
Onondaga County (4 seats)
Ontario County (3 seats)
Orange County (4 seats)
Oswego County (1 seat)
Otsego County (4 seats)
Putnam County (1 seat)
Queens County (2 seats)
Rensselaer County (4 seats)
Richmond County (1 seat)
Rockland County (1 seat)
St. Lawrence County (1 seat)
Saratoga County (3 seats)
Schenectady County (1 seat)
Schoharie County (2 seats)
Seneca County (2 seats)
Steuben County (2 seats)
Suffolk County (2 seats)
Sullivan County (1 seat)
Tioga County (2 seats)
Tompkins County (2 seats)
Ulster County (3 seats)
Warren County (1 seat)
Washington (4 seats)
Wayne County (2 seats)
Westchester County (3 seats)
Yates County (1 seat)

Note: There are now 62 counties in the State of New York. The counties which are not mentioned in this list had not yet been established, or sufficiently organized, the area being included in one or more of the abovementioned counties.

Assemblymen
The asterisk (*) denotes members of the previous Legislature who continued as members of this Legislature. Silas Bowker changed from the Senate to the Assembly.

Employees
Clerk: Horatio Merchant
Sergeant-at-Arms: Daniel Shields
Doorkeeper: Chester Stebbins
Assistant Doorkeeper: Conrad Moore

Notes

Sources
The New York Civil List compiled by Franklin Benjamin Hough (Weed, Parsons and Co., 1858) [see pg. 109 for Senate districts; pg. 126 for senators; pg. 148f for Assembly districts; pg. 202f for assemblymen]
The History of Political Parties in the State of New-York, from the Ratification of the Federal Constitution to 1840 by Jabez D. Hammond (4th ed., Vol. 2, Phinney & Co., Buffalo, 1850; pg. 175 to 205)
Election result Assembly, Albany Co. at project "A New Nation Votes", compiled by Phil Lampi, hosted by Tufts University Digital Library
Election result Assembly, Cayuga Co. at project "A New Nation Votes"
Election result Assembly, Chautauqua Co. at project "A New Nation Votes"
Election result Assembly, Chenango Co. at project "A New Nation Votes"
Election result Assembly, Clinton Co. at project "A New Nation Votes"
Election result Assembly, Erie Co. at project "A New Nation Votes"
Election result Assembly, Greene Co. at project "A New Nation Votes"
Election result Assembly, Jefferson Co. at project "A New Nation Votes"
Election result Assembly, Kings Co. at project "A New Nation Votes"
Election result Assembly, Livingston Co. at project "A New Nation Votes"
Election result Assembly, Monroe Co. at project "A New Nation Votes"
Election result Assembly, Niagara Co. at project "A New Nation Votes"
Election result Assembly, Queens Co. at project "A New Nation Votes"
Election result Assembly, Richmond Co. at project "A New Nation Votes"
Election result Assembly, Rockland Co. at project "A New Nation Votes"
Election result Assembly, Schoharie Co. at project "A New Nation Votes"
Election result Assembly, Seneca Co. at project "A New Nation Votes"
Election result Assembly, Suffolk Co. at project "A New Nation Votes"
Election result Assembly, Ulster Co. at project "A New Nation Votes"
Election result Assembly, Wayne Co. at project "A New Nation Votes"
Election result Assembly, Westchester Co. at project "A New Nation Votes"
Partial election result Senate, First D. at project "A New Nation Votes" [gives only votes of Kings, Richmond and Suffolk Co.]
Partial election result Senate, Second D. at project "A New Nation Votes" [gives only votes of Rockland, Ulster and Westchester Co.]
Partial election result Senate, Third D. at project "A New Nation Votes" [gives only votes of Albany, Greene and Schoharie Co.]
Partial election result Senate, Fourth D. at project "A New Nation Votes" [gives only votes from Clinton Co.]
Partial election result Senate, Sixth D. at project "A New Nation Votes" [gives only votes of Chenango Co.]
Partial election result Senate, Seventh D. at project "A New Nation Votes" [gives only votes of Cayuga, Seneca and Wayne Co.]
Partial election result Senate, Eighth D. at project "A New Nation Votes" [gives only votes from Chautauqua, Erie, Livingston, Monroe and Niagara Co.]

048
1825 in New York (state)
1825 U.S. legislative sessions